Galbraith Mountain is the common name for North Lookout Mountain, located between the communities of Sudden Valley and Bellingham, Washington. A  area was owned by the Trillium Corporation until April 1, 2010, when the company surrendered the property to Polygon Financial Partners instead of defaulting on the loan held by Polygon. Though they are not either of the highest points on Lookout mountain, they are prominent from all over Western Whatcom County. The Whatcom Independent Mountain Pedalers (WHIMPs) created and maintained a large trail system under a 2005 contract with Trillium. The mountain has many access points; the two most popular are from Birch Street, off of Lakeway Drive, and Galbraith Lane, off of Samish Way.

There is active logging on the flanks of the mountain, which has opened clear sight lines from the trails which criss-cross the area. Numerous kiosks and outdoor art were placed throughout the mountain by Trillium and the WMBC, including a bike maintenance station.

As of April 26, 2010, Polygon's planned relationship with the mountain biking community and land use policy has not been established.

References 

Geography of Bellingham, Washington
Mountains of Whatcom County, Washington
Mountains of Washington (state)